Martin Humphrey Moynihan (5 February 1928 – 3 December 1996) was a behavioral evolutionary biologist and ornithologist who studied under Ernst Mayr and Niko Tinbergen, and was a contemporary of Desmond Morris. He was the founding director of the Smithsonian Tropical Research Institute (STRI) in Panama.

His early research was mainly on seagulls. Later work included the octopus, and Terence McKenna quotes Moynihan in his book Food of the Gods as saying, with respect to the octopus' ability to change its body's shape, texture and color, "Like the octopi, our destiny is to become what we think, to have our thoughts become our bodies and our bodies become our thoughts."

He was married to Olga F. Linares, a Panamanian-American anthropologist and STRI senior research scientist.

Moynihan died in Albi, France in 1996 of lung cancer, aged 68.

References

Further reading

External links

 
Martin H. Moynihan Papers, 1952–1996 from the Smithsonian Institution Archives

1928 births
1996 deaths
Evolutionary biologists
Ethologists
Princeton University alumni
Alumni of the University of Oxford
Smithsonian Institution people
Deaths from lung cancer
American ornithologists
Horace Mann School alumni
20th-century American zoologists
Scientists from New York (state)